David Fitter (born 27 January 1977) is a retired Australian rugby union player who played for The Wallabies, Sydney University, Western Force, The Brumbies and London Irish.

Fitter played Australian rules football at Scotch College prior to switching to rugby. In June 2003, he joined the Australia ‘A’ squad playing Japan at the Prince Chichibu Memorial Stadium in Tokyo.

After retiring from rugby he returned to school at Melbourne University to study biomedicine and then postgraduate medicine.

References

External links
Rugby.com.au profile

Living people
1977 births
Australia international rugby union players
People educated at Scotch College, Melbourne
Rugby union players from Melbourne
Rugby union props
21st-century Australian medical doctors
University of Melbourne alumni sportspeople
Australian expatriate rugby union players
Australian expatriate sportspeople in England
Expatriate rugby union players in England
ACT Brumbies players
Western Force players
London Irish players
University of Sydney alumni